Asad Qureshi, is a Pakistani producer, and Chief Operating Officer (COO) of Geo Entertainment, a leading entertainment television network of Pakistan.

Asad Qureshi is also a producer at 7th Sky Entertainment.

Career 
After graduating from Institute of Business Management (IoBM), Qureshi attended University of Southern California and IESE Business School. As reported by The News, "Asad Qureshi has played an instrumental role in bringing innovation to the Pakistan media industry." Since 2004 he has been the director and founding partner of 7th Sky Entertainment. Abdullah Kadwani and Asad Qureshi under the banner of 7th Sky Entertainment has been belting out successive hits.

List of TV serials

References 

1978 births
Living people
Mass media in Pakistan
7th Sky Entertainment
Pakistani television producers
Pakistani film producers